Mama is the eleventh studio album by
South African singer Brenda Fassie, Released on November 4, 1993 by CCP Records. It went on to be sell over 100 000 albums in South Africa by mid 1994.

The album is most notable for Fassie song "Mama" (written by herself). The song received positive reception. In the song, Fassie paid tribute to her mother Sarah Fassie who two years later died.The album also has hit single "Ama-Gents" which is an iconic diss track to Senyaka who first dissed Brenda on his song "Uzonda Magents" because Brenda was publicly dating a woman.

Critical reception

Steve Huey of AllMusic said "Mama is another collection of Soweto township jive from Brenda Fassie; it includes her hit "Ama-Gents."

Track listing
Adapted from

Personnel

Brenda Fassie - Lead Artist 
S. Shandel - Producer

References

Brenda Fassie albums
1997 albums